Mount Strickland is a mountain in the Saint Elias Mountains of Yukon, Canada. The Mountain takes its name from Charles W. Strickland (1935–1983), a refuge Manager of the Kodiak National Wildlife Refuge.


See also

List of mountain peaks of North America
List of mountain peaks of Canada

References

External links

Four-thousanders of Yukon
Saint Elias Mountains